Mrzli Log is a dispersed settlement in the hills west of Črni Vrh in the Municipality of Idrija in the traditional Inner Carniola region of Slovenia.

References

External links
Mrzli Log on Geopedia

Populated places in the Municipality of Idrija